Federico Gattinoni (born 20 June 1984) is an Italian rower. He competed in the men's quadruple sculls event at the 2004 Summer Olympics.

References

External links
 

1984 births
Living people
Italian male rowers
Olympic rowers of Italy
Rowers at the 2004 Summer Olympics
Sportspeople from Lecco